Llewellyn Thomas (1 April 1883 – 2 November 1962) was an Australian cricketer. He played seven first-class matches for Tasmania between 1910 and 1922.

See also
 List of Tasmanian representative cricketers

References

External links
 

1883 births
1962 deaths
Australian cricketers
Tasmania cricketers
Cricketers from Melbourne